Mud Fest annual Holi festival organized in the city of Surat, Gujarat, India to mark the Spring festivities of Holi since 2015.

Mud Fest was started as an alternative to the popular way of playing Holi or Dhuleti played with chemical colours, by substituting them with Fuller's earth mixed with herbs. A giant swimming pool is filled with Fuller's earth mixed with nearly 169 herbal plants having ayurvedic medicinal properties. Founder of Mud Fest, Ornob Moitra says, “The special mud used during Holi is prepared by crushing neem leaves, rose petals, sandalwood paste, multani mitti and mixing all ingredients.” It is incidentally one of the diamond city, Surat's biggest annual cultural festivities."

References

External links
 Official Website of Mud Fest

Tourist attractions in Gujarat
Culture of Surat
Holi
Spring traditions
Spring festivals
2015 establishments in Gujarat
March events